The 2014 World Junior Figure Skating Championships was an international figure skating competition in the 2013–14 season. Commonly called "World Juniors" and "Junior Worlds", the event determined the World Junior champions in the disciplines of men's singles, ladies' singles, pair skating, and ice dancing. It was held in Sofia, Bulgaria.

Records

The following new junior records were set during this competition:

Qualification
Skaters from all ISU member nations were eligible for the competition if they were at least 13 years old but not 19—or 21 for male pair skaters and ice dancers—before 1 July 2013 in their place of birth. National associations select their entries according to their own criteria but the ISU mandates that their selections achieve a minimum technical elements score (TES) at an international event prior to the World Junior Championships.

The term "Junior" in ISU competition refers to age, not skill level. Skaters may remain age-eligible for Junior Worlds even after competing nationally and internationally at the senior level. At junior events, the ISU requires that all programs conform to junior-specific rules regarding program length, jumping passes, types of elements, etc.

Minimum TES

Number of entries per discipline
Based on the results of the 2013 World Junior Championships, the ISU allowed each country one to three entries per discipline.

Entries
Member nations selected the following entries:

Switzerland replaced Nicola Todeschini with Carlo Röthlisberger and Belarus replaced Janina Makeenka with Daria Batura. On 5 March 2014, U.S. Figure Skating stated that the American pair of Chelsea Liu / Devin Perini had withdrawn due to injury and would be replaced by Aya Takai / Brian Johnson. On 6 March 2014, the Russian federation announced that Elena Radionova, having recovered from injury, would replace the lower-ranked Alexandra Proklova, and Evgenia Kosigina / Nikolai Moroshkin would take the place of Alexandra Stepanova / Ivan Bukin, who withdrew due to illness. On 7 March, Canada named Larkyn Austman to replace Julianne Séguin in singles but their third pairs' spot was left unfilled after the withdrawal of Séguin and Charlie Bilodeau. Russia's Maria Sotskova withdrew due to injury and was replaced by Evgenia Medvedeva.

Schedule

Overview
Kaitlin Hawayek / Jean-Luc Baker of the United States finished first in the short dance by a margin of 2.93 points over Russia's Anna Yanovskaya / Sergey Mozgov, the 2013 JGP Final champions, while another American team, Lorraine McNamara / Quinn Carpenter, placed third. Yanovskaya/Mozgov narrowly came in first in the free dance but it was not enough to continue Russian ice dancers' four-year streak of gold medals at the World Junior Championships. Hawayek/Baker became the first American ice dancers to win the title since 2009. Rising from fifth after the short dance, Canada's Madeline Edwards / Zhao Kai Pang took the bronze medal ahead of McNamara/Carpenter who finished fourth.

The pairs' short program saw 2012 World Junior silver medalists, Yu Xiaoyu / Jin Yang of China, take a lead of 3.12 points over Russia's Evgenia Tarasova / Vladimir Morozov, who were trailed closely by Vasilisa Davankova / Andrei Deputat, the 2012 bronze medalists. In the free skating, Yu/Jin were again ranked first, this time by 2.45 points, and won the gold medal by a total margin of 5.57 points. Tarasova/Morozov took the silver medal while another Russian pair, Maria Vigalova / Egor Zakroev, edged past Davankova/Deputat to take the bronze medal.

Canada's Nam Nguyen won the men's short program by a margin of 1.36 over China's Jin Boyang. Several skaters, led by Japan's Shoma Uno and Keiji Tanaka, trailed closely behind. In the free skating, Nguyen narrowly outscored Russia's Adian Pitkeev (by 0.44) and American Nathan Chen (by 1.81). The gold medal was awarded to Nguyen, silver to Pitkeev (4.55 point deficit in the combined score), and bronze to Chen (0.52 of a point behind Pitkeev).

2013 World Junior champion Elena Radionova won the ladies' short program, outscoring teammates Serafima Sakhanovich by a margin of 2.15 and Evgenia Medvedeva by 3.18. Ten points ahead of her nearest rival in the free skating and 12.16 overall, Radionova became the first ladies' single skater to repeat as World Junior champion. Sakhanovich won the silver medal, finishing a total of 3.7 points ahead of Medvedeva, who took the bronze medal. It was the second year in a row that Russia swept the ladies' podium at the World Junior Championships. Japan's Satoko Miyahara finished fourth, less than a point behind Medvedeva.

Results

Men

Ladies

Pairs

Ice dancing

Medals summary

Medalists
Medals for overall placement:

Small medals for placement in the short segment:

Small medals for placement in the free segment:

By country
Table of medals for overall placement:

Table of small medals for placement in the short segment:

Table of small medals for placement in the free segment:

References

External links
 Official site
 International Skating Union
 Starting orders and detailed results at the International Skating Union

World Junior
World Junior Figure Skating Championships
World Junior 2014